The Peace and Truce of God was a movement in the Middle Ages led by the Catholic Church and was one of the most influential mass peace movements in history. The goal of both the Pax Dei and the Treuga Dei was to limit the violence of feuding in the western half of the former Carolingian Empire – following its collapse in the middle of the 9th century – using the threat of spiritual sanctions.  The eastern half of the former Carolingian Empire did not experience the same collapse of central authority, and neither did England. This movement was also marked by popular participation, with many commoners supporting the movement as a solution to the famines, violence, and collapse of the social order around them.

The Peace of God was first proclaimed in 989, at the Council of Charroux. It sought to protect ecclesiastical property, agricultural resources and unarmed clerics. The Truce of God, first proclaimed in 1027 at the Council of Toulouges, attempted to limit the days of the week and times of year that the nobility engaged in violence. The movement survived in some form until the thirteenth century.

Other strategies to deal with the problem of violence in the western half of the former Carolingian Empire include Chivalry and the Crusades.

Georges Duby summarised the widening social repercussions of Pax Dei:

Background
Christian laws regarding violence had evolved from the earlier concept of Pax Romana.

As early as 697, Adomnán of Iona promulgated the Cáin Adomnáin, which provided sanctions against the killing of children, clerics, clerical students and peasants on clerical lands.

Some historians note a preexisting ecclesiastical discussion of peace for secular authorities in 494 with Pope Gelasius I's letter to Emperor Anastasius, which suggested that kings should listen to religious authorities before finalizing their judgments.

This ecclesiastical argument flourished in the eleventh century regarding the issues of secular violence and ecclesiastical precedence over secular authorities as private wars and violent feuding began to endanger both church buildings and monastic communities across Europe. Other ecclesiastical steps to protect church property were also observed from the tenth to the eleventh century, as seen with the Council of Trosly specifically commenting on the role of destruction of church property as sacrilegious.

Overview

The Peace of God was first proclaimed in 989, at the Council of Charroux. It sought to protect ecclesiastical property, agricultural resources and unarmed clerics. After the collapse of the Carolingian empire in the ninth century, France had degenerated into many small counties and lordships, in which local lords and knights frequently fought each other for control. The West Frankish nobility capitalised on the accession of the Carolingian throne and ushered in the Capetian dynasty and further altered French, and by extension, European medieval society. One of the critical points of this dynastic shift is what Guy Bois characterises "the mutation of the year 1000," wherein the period is known for the inexorable link between chaos and creativity. The chaos of the period is attributed to the issue of violent feuding, with the castellans and their milites working towards consolidated power and freedom from the overarching political structure of the Carolingian empire. Frederick S. Paxton argues that the political and cultural landscape of the period highlights some of the prevailing cultural anxieties and issues surrounding the millennium, particularly "unparalleled disorder in governmental, legal, and social institutions" and Carolingian society was faced with a "king unable and the nobility unwilling to act [causing] the French people, imbued with a 'national spirit' peculiarly creative in the fight against political and social ills, turned to spiritual sanctions as the only available means to limit violence."

Later proclaimed in 1027 at the Council of Toulouges, they attempted to limit the days of the week and times of year that the nobility engaged in violence. While some historians have postulated that the Peace of God and Truce of God movements stem from the inability or unwillingness of the top tiers of Carolingian society to quell the violence and feuding amongst Capetian nobles, other scholars have argued that there was a castellan revolution ongoing in the Frankish kingdoms that contributed to the problem. According to André Debord, the Peace and Truce movements originated in the reaction against the social and political upheaval that stemmed from rapid proliferation of castle-building during the early eleventh century, particularly in Aquitaine. The major point of contention in early eleventh century France was the role of comital power and the ways in which social forces exerted influence on the possession of power. Around 1030, and at the same general time as the deaths of William the Great, William IV, and Ademar of Chabannes, comital power was supreme in the Charente. This period was the site of transformation of the comital power of dukes and counts because castle construction was an inherent consolidation of power, but at the same time "those who held comital fortresses had a distinct tendency toward insubordination as soon as the count or duke turned their backs," hence figures who held little traditional power, such as Hugh the Chiliarc, "could cause the prestigious duke of Aquitaine the worst kind of difficulties."

At the same time there were often attacks from the Vikings, who settled in northern France as Normans but continued to raid territory further inland.

The two movements began at separate times and places, but by the eleventh century they became synonymous as the "Peace and Truce of God".  "Germans looked with mingled horror and contempt at the French 'anarchy'. To Maintain the king's peace was the first duty of a German sovereign."  The movement, though seemingly redundant to the duties of the crown, had a religious momentum that would not be denied.  Holy Roman Emperor Henry III  issued the earliest form of this in his empire while at Constance in 1043. Some scholars connect it to the subsequent concept of Landfriede in the Holy Roman Empire, although others suggest Landfreide existed alongside or prior to these movements.

Peace of God

The Peace of God or Pax Dei was a proclamation issued by local clergy that granted immunity from violence to noncombatants who could not defend themselves, beginning with the peasants (agricolae) and with the clergy. The Synod of Charroux decreed a limited Pax Dei in 989, and the practice spread to most of Western Europe over the next century, surviving in some form until at least the thirteenth century.

At the Benedictine abbey of Charroux in La Marche on the borders of the Aquitaine "a great crowd of many people (populus) gathered there from the Poitou, the Limousin, and neighbouring regions. Many bodies of saints were also brought there "bringing miracles in their wake". Three canons promulgated at Charroux, under the leadership of Gombald Archbishop of Bordeaux and Gascony, were signed by the bishops of Poitiers, Limoges, Périgueux, Saintes and Angoulême, all in the west of France beyond the limited jurisdiction of King Hugh Capet. Excommunication would be the punishment for attacking or robbing a church, for robbing peasants or the poor of farm animals – among which the donkey is mentioned, but not the horse (an item beyond the reach of a peasant) – and for robbing, striking or seizing a priest or any man of the clergy "who is not bearing arms".  Making compensation or reparations could circumvent the anathema of the Church.

Children and women (virgins and widows) were added to the early protections. The Pax Dei prohibited nobles from invading churches, from beating the defenceless, from burning houses, and so on. A synod of 1033 added merchants and their goods to the protected list. Significantly, the Peace of God movement began in Aquitaine, Burgundy and Languedoc, areas where central authority had most completely fragmented.

The participation of large, enthusiastic crowds marks the Pax Dei phenomenon as one of the first popular religious movements of the Middle Ages. In the early phase, the blend of relics and crowds and enthusiasm stamped the movement with an exceptionally popular character.

After a lull in the first two decades of the eleventh century, the movement spread to the north of France with the support of king Robert II of France (reigned 996–1031). There, the high nobility sponsored Peace assemblies throughout Flanders, Burgundy, Champagne, Normandy, the Amiénois, and Berry. The oaths to keep the peace sworn by nobles spread in time to the villagers themselves; heads of households meeting communally would ritually swear to uphold the common peace.

The tenth-century foundation of the Cluny Abbey in Burgundy aided the development of the Peace of God. Cluny was independent of any secular authority, subject to the Papacy alone, and while all church territory was inviolate, Cluny's territory extended far beyond its own boundaries. A piece of land 30 km in diameter was considered to be part of Cluny itself, and any smaller monastery that allied itself with Cluny was granted the same protection from violence. A Peace of God council gave this grant in Anse in 994. The monastery was also immune from excommunications, interdicts, and anathemas, which would normally affect an entire region. Fleury Abbey was granted similar protection. Many Cluniac monks came from the same knightly class whose violence they were trying to stop.

The movement was not very effective. However it set a precedent that would be followed by other successful popular movements to control nobles' violence such as medieval communes and the Crusades.

The phrase "Peace of God" also occurs as a general term that means "under the protection of the Church", used in multiple contexts in medieval society. For example, pilgrims who travelled on Crusade did so under the "peace of God" i.e. under the protection of the Church. This general usage of the term does not always relate to the Peace and Truce of God movement.

Peace of God and Popular Participation

One subset of the movement is known as the Limousin Peace of God (994–1032/3). The most important source documenting the Limousin movement is the contemporary writer Ademar of Chabannes (989-1034). Ademar is a monk of Saint-Eparchius of Angoulême, who spent time at Saint-Martial in Limoges and was a historian, liturgist, grammarian, and artist. The Limousin Peace of God movement is generally accepted as mostly fiction because Ademar seems to have created a fiction about the actual development of the Peace of God in Aquitaine. One of the points that Richard Landes and other historians have noted is there was a Peace of God movement in Aquitaine because Rodulphus Glaber, writing about the Peace councils in Francia in 1033, did state that the movement started in Aquitaine.

One of the major points of Landes' historiographical examination of the early councils of Limoges is the fact that ecclesiastical authorities promoted cultural and religious enthusiasm within the conciliar activities in the late tenth and early eleventh century. Landes, well known for his work on the apocalyptic strains of thought surrounding the year 1000, argues that the conciliar activities at Limoges and other areas in Aquitaine are crucial to understanding the role of the Peace of God movement overall because of the combination of the apocalyptic attitudes nearing the end of the tenth century and the popularity of penitential practices for natural and man-made disasters. In the case of Limoges, there was a major outbreak of a "'plague of plagues,' probably ergotism" and "the abbot and the bishop (brothers of the viscount), in consultation with the duke of Aquitaine, called for a three-day fast during which relics from all over would come to Limoges."

The emphasis on relics in this particular instance is crucial to understanding the development of the Peace of God movement overall because popular participation in this movement across Europe stems from the popularity of relics and the penitential practices linked to the cult of the saints. In the case of Limoges, the cult of Saint Martial takes precedence because of the miracles attested to his shrine during the Peace council of 994. From the Vita prolixior s. Martialis, the narrative directly correlates to Peace ideals:

Truce of God
The Truce of God or Treuga Dei had its origin in Normandy in the city of Caen. It dates from the eleventh century.

While the Truce of God is a temporary suspension of hostilities, as distinct from the Peace of God which is perpetual, the jurisdiction of the Truce of God is broader. The Truce of God prohibited fighting on Sundays and feria (feast days on which people were not obliged to work). It was the sanctification of Sunday which gave rise to the Truce of God, for it had always been agreed not to do battle on that day and to suspend disputes in the law-courts.

It confirmed permanent peace for all churches and their grounds, the monks, clerks and chattels; all women, pilgrims, merchants and their servants, cattle and horses; and men at work in the fields. For all others peace was required throughout Advent, the season of Lent, and from the beginning of the Rogation days until eight days after Pentecost. This prohibition was subsequently extended to specific days of the week, viz., Thursday, in memory of the Ascension, Friday, the day of the Passion, and Saturday, the day of the Resurrection (council 1041). By the middle of the twelfth century the number of prescribed days was extended until there were some eighty days left for fighting.

The Truce soon spread from France to Italy and Germany; the 1179 Third Council of the Lateran extended the institution to the whole Church by Canon xxi, "De treugis servandis", which was inserted in the collection of canon law, Decretal of Gregory IX, I, tit., "De treuga et pace". Aquinas challenged the Truce, holding that it was lawful to wage war to safeguard the commonwealth on holy days and feast days.

Peace of God and Truce of God within Chivalry and Crusade

One of the interesting developments beginning at the end of the tenth century and continuing well into the eleventh century is the rhetoric of the Peace of God and Truce of God movements within chivalric pledges and as a way to divert knightly violence away from one's own country. While the Peace of God and the Truce of God must be seen as separately developing movements in Europe in terms of the roles of these movements martially and civilly, there are instances where the rhetoric of the movements is combined within oaths and speeches by both secular and ecclesiastical leaders, such as by secular leader Robert the Pious (996–1031).

The oath is important because it shows that secular powers are now willing to show obedience to ecclesiastical powers and to rein in problematic knights and armies. Furthermore, knightly and martial violence is often subverted by ecclesiastical powers through the use of crusade. For Pope Urban II, at the Council of Clermont in 1095, the subversion of martial violence is effective in dealing with secular violence:

The Peace of God and the Truce of God therefore worked within the rhetorical landscape of subverting violence by redirecting it to more applicable regions, such as a crusade in the Middle East against Islam in an attempt to regain Jerusalem.

Other developments
Beginning in the 11th century, knighthood developed a religious character. Prospective knights underwent rigorous religious rituals in order to be initiated. An initiate had to fast, confess his sins, was given a symbolic bath, had his hair cut to represent humility, and he spent a night praying, his weapons upon an altar representing the dedication of his weapons to the Church and God. Advancements in metallurgy allowed inscriptions and pictures of holy symbols to be engraved on helmets, swords, shields, a horse’s saddle and bridle. Relics and objects with religious symbols, often of saints, on them were routinely carried into battles by knights in medieval times. The symbols allowed for a physical reminder to knights and military men that God was supporting their efforts, providing protection to those soldiers as well as the assurance of a victory over their enemies.

In addition to the Peace and Truce of God movement, other non-violent, although less direct, methods of controlling violence were used by the clergy. By adding the religious oaths of fealty to the feudal act of homage, and in organising rights and duties within the system, churchmen did their utmost to civilise feudal society in general and to set limits on feudal violence in particular.

Louis IX of France was famous for his attention to the settlement of disputes and the maintenance of peace, at least within the Kingdom of France. He issued the first extant ordinance indefinitely prohibiting warfare in France, a text dating from January 1258 that outlawed guerre omnes as well as arson, and disturbances to carts and to agricolae who work with carts or ploughs. Those who transgressed this prohibition were to be punished as peace-breakers (fractores pacis) by the king's officer and the bishop-elect of le Puy-en-Velay. Louis IX promulgated this text as a simple royal act on the basis of his authority as king.

The Bianchi was a religious movement that swept through Italy for several months in 1399. Tens of thousands of men, women and children could be found travelling across the country to pray and promote peace. It was a shock to many observers and caught authorities off guard. It also brought peace, at least for a few months, to much of Italy.

See also
 Catholic peace traditions
 Cluniac Reforms
 Anglo-Saxon law (King's Peace)
 Landfrieden
 Religion and peacebuilding
 Cáin Adomnáin
 Peace Testimony
 "I am a Catalan", a 1971 speech by Pau Casals praising the Peace and Truce of God.
 Olympic Truce, truce promoted during the Olympic Games

References

Bibliography
 Daileader, Philip, The High Middle Ages. Chantilly, VA : Teaching Co., c2001.
 Debord, André. "The Castellan Revolution and the Peace of God." In The Peace of God: Social Violence and Religious Response in France around the Year 1000. Ithaca: Cornell University Press: 1992. 135–164.
 
 
 Thomas Head, "The Development of the Peace of God in Aquitaine (970-1005)," Speculum 74, no. 3 (Jul., 1999): 656-686. 
 
 
 
 Landes, Richard. "Between Aristocracy and Heresy: Popular Participation in the Limousin Peace of God, 994-1033. In The Peace of God: Social Violence and Religious Response in France around the Year 1000. Ithaca: Cornell University Press: 1992. 184–218.
 Paxton, Frederick S. "History, Historians, and the Peace of God." In The Peace of God: Social Violence and Religious Response in France around the Year 1000. Ithaca: Cornell University Press: 1992. 21–40.
 
Peace of God – Synod of Charroux, 989
Paul Freedman, "The Diocese of Vic: the Heroic Era of the Church of Vic, 886–1099"
Truce of God – Bishopric of Terouanne, 1063
"Truce of God". In Encyclopædia Britannica Online.

External links
Gunbald of Bordeaux, Peace of God
Decree of the Emperor Henry IV Concerning a Truce of God; 1085 A.D. 

Catholicism in the Middle Ages
989 establishments
13th-century disestablishments in Europe
Christian terminology

pt:Paz de deus